Bučkovići na Bezujanci (Cyrillic: Бучковићи на Безујанци) is a village in the municipality of Čajniče, Bosnia and Herzegovina.

References

Populated places in Čajniče